Khoon Aur Paani is a 1981 Hindi-language action film, produced by A. A. Nadiadwala under the A.G.Films Pvt. Ltd. banner and directed by Chand. It stars Feroz Khan, Jeetendra, Rekha, Parveen Babi  and music composed by Laxmikant–Pyarelal.

Plot
Singh (P. Jairaj) is a farmer and lives a poor lifestyle along with his wife Mrs. Singh (Nirupa Roy) and two sons, Ram and Laxman. The region is drought-stricken, while in contrast, there is plenty of water being pumped to bathe the dogs of Thakur Vikram Singh (Ajit). When Ram decides to divert some water for their parched fields, Vikram Singh kills his father. An enraged Ram goes to avenge his death, manages to kill Vikram's brother Badi Thakur, but is seriously injured, loses his memory and ends up with a gang of bandits and is renamed Thanedar Singh, as he was dressed in the clothes of a police inspector. Lakshman also gets separated from his mother and is found near a river bank by Police Commissioner Bhalla (Om Shivpuri), who adopts him. Years later, the two brothers are fated to meet again, albeit, as strangers and mortal enemies, Ram (Feroz Khan) is dreaded bandit Thanedar Singh a dacoit, who is unable to recall his childhood, and loses control whenever he hears the sound of a water-pump and Laxman (Jeetendra) is an incognito CBI Officer Rakesh. The remaining story shows how two brothers unite with their mother.

Cast

Feroz Khan as Ram Singh / Thanedar Singh 
Jeetendra as Laxman Singh / CBI Inspector Rakesh / Rocky / Raka
Rekha as Champa 
Parveen Babi as Rita
Rajesh Khanna as Special Appearance 
Nirupa Roy as Mrs. Singh 
Ranjeet as Vijay Singh 
Ajit as Thakur Vikram Singh 
Satyendra Kapoor as Shakal 
Iftekhar as DSP Khan
P. Jairaj as Mr. Singh  
Om Shivpuri as Police Commissioner Bhalla  
Mukri as Saramji Rustamji Bochwala  
Jagdeep as Havaldar Maan Singh Gandotra 
Jagdish Raj as Johnny  
Habib as Sardar 
Master Bittoo as Young Ram 
Master Raju as Young Laxman Singh
Master Romi as Young Vijay

Soundtrack

References

External links
 

1980s Hindi-language films
Films scored by Laxmikant–Pyarelal